Mezilečí is a municipality and village in Náchod District in the Hradec Králové Region of the Czech Republic. It has about 100 inhabitants.

Administrative parts
The village of Posadov is an administrative part of Mezilečí.

References

Villages in Náchod District